The 2005–06 Divizia A was the eighty-eighth season of Divizia A, the top-level football league of Romania. Season began in August 2005 and ended in June 2006. Steaua București became champions on 7 June 2006.

Team changes

Relegated
The teams that were relegated to the Divizia B at the end of the previous season:
 Apulum Alba Iulia
 Brașov
 Universitatea Craiova

Promoted
The teams that were promoted from the Divizia B at the beginning of the season:
 Vaslui
 Pandurii Târgu Jiu
 Jiul Petroșani

Venues

Personnel and kits

League table

Positions by round

Results

Attendances

Top goalscorers

Champion squad

See also
2005–06 in Romanian football

References

Liga I seasons
Romania
1